Events from the year 1683 in France.

Incumbents 
Monarch: Louis XIV

Events

Births
 4 February – Jean-Baptiste Bénard de la Harpe, explorer of North America (d. 1765)
 28 February – René Antoine Ferchault de Réaumur, scientist (d. 1757)
 23 June – Etienne Fourmont, orientalist (d. 1745)
 25 September – Jean-Philippe Rameau, composer (d. 1764)

Deaths
 

 10 July – François-Eudes de Mézeray, French historian (b. 1610)
 30 July – Maria Theresa of Spain, first wife of Louis XIV of France (b. 1638)
 6 September – Jean-Baptiste Colbert, French minister of finance (b. 1619)

See also

References

1680s in France